"Psycho Killer" is a song by the American band Talking Heads, released on their 1977 debut album Talking Heads: 77.  The group first performed it as the Artistics in 1974.

The band also recorded an acoustic version of the song featuring Arthur Russell on cello. In the liner notes for Once in a Lifetime: The Best of Talking Heads (1992), Jerry Harrison wrote of the B-side of the single, "I'm glad we persuaded Tony [Bongiovi] and Lance [Quinn] that the version with the cellos shouldn't be the only one."

The band's "signature debut hit" features lyrics which seem to represent the thoughts of a serial killer. Originally written and performed as a ballad, "Psycho Killer" became what AllMusic calls a "deceptively funky new wave/no wave song" with "an insistent rhythm, and one of the most memorable, driving basslines in rock & roll."

"Psycho Killer" was the only song from the album to appear on the Billboard Hot 100 chart, peaking at number 92. It reached number 32 on the Triple J Hottest 100 in 1989, and peaked at number 11 on the Dutch singles chart in 1977. The song is included in The Rock and Roll Hall of Fame's 500 Songs that Shaped Rock and Roll.

Lyrics
The song was composed near the beginning of the band's career and prototype versions were performed onstage as early as December 1975. When it was finally completed and released as a single in December 1977, "Psycho Killer" became instantly associated in popular culture with the contemporaneous Son of Sam serial killings. Although the band always insisted that the song had no inspiration from the notorious events, the single's release date was "eerily timely" and marked by a "macabre synchronicity".

According to the preliminary lyric sheets copied onto the 2006 remaster of Talking Heads: 77, the song started off as a semi-narrative of the killer actually committing murders. In the liner notes of Once in a Lifetime: The Best of Talking Heads, Byrne says:

The bridge lyrics are in French, as is the prominent chorus line "Qu'est-ce que c'est?" ("What is this/it?"). The bridge lyrics are:

The French lyrics were supplied by Weymouth. According to Frantz, "I told David that Tina's mother is French and that they always spoke French in the home. Tina agreed to do it and just sat down and did it in a little over an hour. I wrote a couple of more verses, and within a few hours, 'Psycho Killer' was more or less done."

Later releases
Talking Heads performed the song on the BBC2 television show The Old Grey Whistle Test on January 31, 1978. The performance was later released on a DVD compilation of performances from the show.

A live version recorded in 1977 for radio broadcast was released on The Name of This Band Is Talking Heads in 1982, featuring an additional verse not heard in the studio version, and the later CD release included a second, later live version from the Remain in Light tour. In 1984, another live version was included on the soundtrack for the band's concert movie Stop Making Sense. The film opens with Byrne alone onstage, announcing "'Hi. I've got a tape I want to play'...[and] strumming maniacally like Richie Havens," playing an acoustic version of "Psycho Killer", backed only by a Roland TR-808 drum machine whose sound appears to be issuing from a boombox.

The song also appears on their 1992 compilation album Sand in the Vaseline: Popular Favorites and, over a decade later, on another compilation album The Best of Talking Heads.

Charts

Certifications

Legacy
The song has been recorded in cover versions by many bands including Julie Christensen, Velvet Revolver, James Hall, Cage the Elephant, Phish, Antiseen, Richard Thompson, The Bobs, Moxy Früvous, Rico, Victoria Vox, Wet Leg,  and the Ukulele Orchestra of Great Britain at the 2009 BBC Proms.

Massachusetts-based band The Fools parodied the song and entitled it "Psycho Chicken"; it was included as a bonus record with their major-label debut album Sold Out in 1980. Ice-T says that "Psycho Killer" was a starting influence for his band Body Count's controversial song "Cop Killer". Singer Selena Gomez samples the bassline on her 2017 single "Bad Liar." A Talking Heads tribute band based in Baltimore, active since 2011, call themselves the Psycho Killers.

References

1974 songs
1977 singles
Talking Heads songs
Sire Records singles
Song recordings produced by Tony Bongiovi
Songs written by Chris Frantz
Songs written by David Byrne
Songs written by Tina Weymouth
Macaronic songs
The Flying Pickets songs
Franglais songs
Art rock songs
Songs about criminals
Songs about mental health